Khoratosuchus is an extinct genus of neosuchian crocodylomorph which existed in northeast Thailand during the early Cretaceous period. Its type species is Khoratosuchus jintasakuli. Khoratosuchus is the youngest and most advanced Mesozoic crocodyliform yet known from Thailand. It possesses several distinctive features that help determine its phylogenetic position among crocodylomorphs, including secondary choanae relatively posterior and almost encircled by the pterygoid bones on the palate and a smooth dorsal surface of the skull.

References

Early Cretaceous crocodylomorphs of Asia
Fossil taxa described in 2009
Neosuchians
Prehistoric pseudosuchian genera